K-44 is a state highway in the U.S. state of Kansas. It begins at K-2 in Anthony and passes through Harper and Sumner counties in the south-central portion of the state, ending at K-49 north of Caldwell. Its alignment has not undergone a major change since then.

Route description
K-44 begins at a junction with K-2 in Anthony, the county seat of Harper County; within the city limits of Anthony, K-44 is known as Main Street. The highway crosses the Chikaskia River north of Caldwell. Just east of the river crossing, the route curves slightly to the southeast and comes to an intersection with K-49, where it ends.

All but  of K-44's alignment is maintained by the Kansas Department of Transportation (KDOT). The entire section within Anthony is maintained by the city. In 2013, KDOT measured traffic counts in terms of average annual daily traffic (AADT) on K-44 ranging from a high of 729 vehicles in Anthony to a low of 313 vehicles in western Sumner County.

History
K-44 first appeared on the 1927 Kansas state highway map. Its alignment when it was designated is identical to that which it follows today; however, the road was not yet paved. This did not happen until sometime between 1948 and 1950, and the highway has not been majorly modified since then.

Junction list

References

External links

Kansas Highways Routelog—K-44

044
Transportation in Harper County, Kansas
Transportation in Sumner County, Kansas